Peter Märthesheimer (Kiel, 9 July 1937 – Berlin, 18 June 2004) was a German screenwriter, producer and author.

Early years 
Märthesheimer studied economics and sociology in Frankfurt am Main. From 1964 onwards he was editor and dramaturge at WDR for ten years, then at Bavaria Film until 1981. In 1994 he became professor for screenplay and dramaturgy at the Film Academy Baden-Württemberg. He was also a dramaturgy consultant at the University of Television and Film Munich and the BKM.

In collaboration with Pea Fröhlich he wrote the screenplays for the Rainer Werner Fassbinder films The Marriage of Maria Braun and Veronika Voss. He was a producer for the film Martha. The TV series Eight Hours Don't Make a Day and Berlin Alexanderplatz he cooperated with Fassbinder. In collaboration with Wolfgang Menge he created the sensational television productions Das Millionenspiel and Smog as well as the unconventional family series Ein Herz und eine Seele.

In 2000 he published the novel Ich bin die Andere. In the book he dealt with the subject of multiple personalities.

His written legacy can be found in the archive of the Academy of Arts in Berlin.

Filmography

Production

Screenplay

Audio drama 

 Krupp oder die Erfindung des bürgerlichen Zeitalters (Production: WDR 2002)
 Lenz oder Das richtige Leben (Production: WDR 2005)

Awards 

 1973: Special honour at the Adolf Grimme Preis for Eight Hours Don't Make a Day
 1978: Goldene Kamera
 1981: Honourable Mention at the Adolf Grimme Preis für Berlin Alexanderplatz (along with Günter Rohrbach)
 2000: Mara-Cassens-Preis of the Literature House Hamburg for Ich bin die Andere

References

External links
 
 Literatur von und über Peter Märthesheimer in the catalogue of the german national library
 Peter Märthesheimer on kino.de
 Peter-Märthesheimer-Archiv in the archive of the Academy of Arts, Berlin

1937 births
2004 deaths
Mass media people from Kiel
Sozialistischer Deutscher Studentenbund members
German male writers